Room 13 is a 1964 thriller film directed by Harald Reinl and starring Joachim Fuchsberger, Karin Dor and Richard Häussler. It was made as a co-production between West Germany, France and Denmark, based on the 1924 novel Room 13 by Edgar Wallace. It was part of a long-running German series of Wallace adaptations made by Rialto Film.

The film's sets were designed by the art directors Walter Kutz and Wilhelm Vorwerg. It was shot at the Spandau Studios in Berlin and on location in Copenhagen.

Cast

See also
Mr. Reeder in Room 13 (1938)
The Mind of Mr. J.G. Reeder (1969–71)

References

External links

1960s mystery thriller films
1960s serial killer films
German mystery thriller films
West German films
Danish thriller films
Films directed by Harald Reinl
Constantin Film films
Films set in London
Films shot in Denmark
Films based on British novels
Films based on works by Edgar Wallace
German serial killer films
French serial killer films
French mystery thriller films
Films shot at Spandau Studios
1960s German films
1960s French films
1960s German-language films